Maryland v. Pringle, 540 U.S. 366 (2003), was a decision by the Supreme Court of the United States in which the Court unanimously upheld the arrest of three passengers in an automobile where drugs were found. The case regards the reasonableness of the arrest of a passenger in an automobile.

Background 
Near 3 a.m. on August 7, 1999, a police officer in Baltimore County, Maryland pulled over a car for speeding and for the driver's failure to wear a seatbelt. The car was being driven by Donte Partlow, the vehicle's owner, and had two passengers: Joseph Pringle in the front seat, and Otis Smith in the backseat. The officer asked to see Partlow's license and registration, where the officer spotted a large sum of money in the glove compartment. As the officer gave Partlow a verbal warning, a second officer arrived on the scene. The second officer asked if there were any weapons or narcotics in the car, which Partlow denied, giving the officers permission to search the vehicle. Upon searching, the officers found cocaine behind the backseat armrest, as well as $763 in cash in the glove compartment. The officers asked who the cocaine belonged to, and all three denied owning it. All three suspects were then arrested.

At the police station, Pringle waived his Miranda rights and admitted that the drugs were his. Partlow and Smith were subsequently released without charge. Pringle was convicted of possession with intent to distribute cocaine and possession of cocaine, and was sentenced to 10 years incarceration without the possibility of parole. The Maryland Court of Special Appeals affirmed, but the Maryland Court of Appeals reversed, holding that, absent specific facts tending to show Pringle's knowledge and dominion or control over the drugs, the mere finding of cocaine in the back armrest when Pringle was a front-seat passenger in a car being driven by its owner was insufficient to establish probable cause for an arrest for possession of drugs.

Opinion of the Court 
Chief Justice Rehnquist delivered the opinion for a unanimous Court.

Because the officer had probable cause to arrest Pringle, the arrest did not contravene the Fourth and Fourteenth Amendments to the United States Constitution. Maryland law authorizes police officers to execute warrantless arrests where the officer has probable cause to believe that a felony has been committed or is being committed in the officer's presence. Here, it is uncontested that the officer, upon recovering the suspected cocaine, had probable cause to believe a felony had been committed; the question is whether he had probable cause to believe Pringle committed that crime.

The "substance of all the definitions of probable cause is a reasonable ground for belief of guilt," Brinegar v. United States, 338 U. S. 160, 175, and that belief must be particularized with respect to the person to be searched or seized, Ybarra v. Illinois, 444 U. S. 85, 91. To determine whether an officer had probable cause to make an arrest, a court must examine the events leading up to the arrest, and then decide "whether these historical facts, viewed from the standpoint of an objectively reasonable police officer, amount to" probable cause. Ornelas v. United States, 517 U. S. 690, 696.

As it is an entirely reasonable inference from the facts here that any or all of the car's occupants had knowledge of, and exercised dominion and control over, the cocaine, a reasonable officer could conclude that there was probable cause to believe Pringle committed the crime of possession of cocaine, either solely or jointly. Reversed and remanded.

See also 
 List of United States Supreme Court cases, volume 540
 List of United States Supreme Court cases

References

 References

 Sources
 
 
 
 
 Maryland v. Pringle, 540 U.S. 366 (2003)

External links 
 Written Opinion

United States Supreme Court cases
2003 in United States case law
United States Fourth Amendment case law
United States Supreme Court cases of the Rehnquist Court